Cormic F. Cosgrove (February 15, 1869 – July 6, 1930) was an American amateur soccer player who competed in the 1904 Summer Olympics. He died in St. Louis, Missouri. In 1904 he was a member of the St. Rose Parish team, which won the bronze medal in the soccer tournament. He played all four matches.

References

External links
Profile

1869 births
1930 deaths
American soccer players
Footballers at the 1904 Summer Olympics
Olympic bronze medalists for the United States in soccer
Soccer players from Missouri
Medalists at the 1904 Summer Olympics
Association football forwards